Claudia Blasberg (born 14 February 1975 in Dresden) is a German rower.

References 
 
 

1975 births
Living people
German female rowers
Rowers from Dresden
Olympic rowers of Germany
Rowers at the 2000 Summer Olympics
Rowers at the 2004 Summer Olympics
Olympic silver medalists for Germany
Olympic medalists in rowing
Medalists at the 2004 Summer Olympics
World Rowing Championships medalists for Germany
Medalists at the 2000 Summer Olympics
21st-century German women
20th-century German women